Mun Awng (born 1960) is a Kachin singer, songwriter, and pro-democracy activist. Awng was born in the Kachin State in north of Burma to a small Christian minority. His Christian name was Dennis Daws, a name he later changed. Awng became a popular singer and musician in Burma during the 1980s. Due to having participated in the wave of anti-government demonstrations in 1988, that resulted in more than 3,000 dead civilians, he was forced to leave Burma and has been living in exile in Eidsvoll, Norway since. He fled to Norway to work with the opposition Democratic Voice of Burma radio and television broadcaster. From abroad he continued to release albums and activists sang his songs while facing down the military in both the 1996, and the 2007 anti-government street protests. Awng is considered a "subversive element" by the military junta in Burma.

Music
Awng's music is a mix of Western style rock music and east Asian ballads. Since he flew into exile he has not produced more than two albums in the last fourteen years. Even under the scrutiny of the notorious censorship board, the Press Scrutiny Board, Awng managed to produce one album a year in Burma. He occasionally performs his music for Burmese exiles in other countries.

For The Lady
In 2004 Awng was part of a musical project to raise funds for the US campaign for Democracy in Burma. Together with well-known pop stars such as U2, Avril Lavigne, Talib Kweli and more they created an album dedicated to the famous Burmese democracy activist Aung San Suu Kyi. Awng penned the album's final cut with his "Tempest of Blood".

References

External links
 BBC Burmese - For The Lady
 "Bloody Storm" by Mun Awng (Youtube)

1960 births
Living people
20th-century Burmese male singers
Burmese democracy activists
Politics of Myanmar
Political repression in Myanmar
Burmese emigrants to Norway